Lance Corporal Peter Goggins (1894 – 18 January 1917) was a British soldier who was executed for desertion during the First World War. His case later became a well publicised example of the injustices of British military discipline during the war, and he was pardoned in 2006.

Biography
Born in South Moor, Durham, Goggins was a miner who joined the 19th Battalion, Durham Light Infantry as a volunteer, although his occupation exempted him from conscription.

On 26 November 1916, Goggins was guarding a position near Arras on the Western Front with Corporal John McDonald. Both men were subsequently charged with deserting their posts, and in spite of Stones' evidence that he had given the order to retreat, they were convicted at court martial on Christmas Eve and sentenced to death. Stones was sentenced to death at a separate court martial several days later for casting away his rifle in the same incident. The sentences were supported by Brigadier-General H O'Donnell, who wrote that he had doubts about the quality of the evidence, but felt that the executions were necessary to set an example to other men in the battalion. All three men were executed on 18 January. The chaplain who prayed with them before their deaths remarked that he had never met three braver men.

Goggins' execution had a devastating effect on his family. His wife of six months disappeared soon afterwards, and his mother had a nervous breakdown. He was seldom mentioned by his family, who saw his conviction as a source of shame, and his niece, Marina Brewis, who had simply been told that he died in the war, only learned his true fate years later from a television documentary. On learning the truth she began a campaign for her uncle to be pardoned.

Goggins' case became a well-publicised example of the injustices of the First World War due to the efforts of Marina Brewis, the fact that he had apparently been following orders, and the fact that the triple execution was unique. In 2006, Goggins was finally pardoned along with the other 305 British and British Empire soldiers executed for cowardice during the First World War, under the terms of the Armed Forces Act 2006. His case had been one of those discussed in Parliament during the passage of the Act.

See also
Harry Farr
Shot at Dawn Memorial

References

1894 births
1917 deaths
Durham Light Infantry soldiers
British Army personnel executed during World War I
British Army personnel of World War I
British Army personnel who were court-martialled
Recipients of British royal pardons
Deaths by firearm in France
People from South Moor
Military personnel from County Durham